North Hangook Falling is the second solo album by Mike Park. The title translates to "North Korea Falling" in English. The album was recorded in a week in January 2005 at a total cost of $2,800. The album is predominantly acoustic in feel, though there is some use of electric instrumentation.

Track listing
"Is It Safe For Me To Go Outside?" – 2:46
"Keeping This Seat Warm" – 2:35
"Born To Kill" – 2:47
"Crazed Man" – 3:13
"Asian Prodigy" – 3:43
"Kiss Me Baby, I'm Always Here For You" – 4:17
"Korea Is So Far Away" – 3:32
"I Can Hear The Whisperings" – 2:48
"Dear Canada" – 3:04
"When Is The Moment That You'll Sing?" – 2:58
"North Hangook Falling" – 4:25
"Blue Marble" (live) – 2:30

Personnel
Mike Park: Acoustic Guitar, Vocals
Pat Ford: Electric/Acoustic/Bass Guitars, Background Vocals
Rob Kellenberger: Drums/Percussion, Background Vocals
Jenny Choi: Cello, Keyboards
Jason Flaks: Electric Guitar
Steve Borth: Background Vocals

2005 albums
Mike Park albums